Robert Russ (born 20 September 1971) is a music producer from Berlin-Reinickendorf, Germany. He is the first German producer to be awarded with a Grammy for the Best Historical Album at the 60th Annual Grammy Awards in 2018.

Life 
Robert Russ is mainly known in the United States as a producer of elaborate artist editions with recordings of Columbia Records and RCA Records (both part of Sony Music Entertainment): "Robert Russ, who produced Sony's recent boxed sets of Reiner/Chicago and Pierre Monteux recordings, has done as usual thorough job" (John von Rhein, Chicago Tribune, 13. December 2016). His "ambitious archival project" (Anthony Tommasini, The New York Times, 15. November 2013), the release of previously unknown live recordings of American pianist Vladimir Horowitz from New York's Carnegie Hall, caused a stir in 2013.

His historically significant documentary "the ultimate find of recording history" (Anthony Tommasini, The New York Times, 2. February 2018), a set with Canadian pianist Glenn Gould’s complete recording sessions for his famous debut album of Bach's Goldberg Variations Glenn Gould—The Goldberg Variations—The Complete Unreleased Recording Sessions June 1955 was nominated for a Grammy in 2017, and in 2016 he received a nomination for the edition Vladimir Horowitz—The Unreleased Live Recordings 1966–1983, a collection of 25 previously unpublished live recitals of the pianist.

In 2021, Russ produced the first complete edition of all recordings by African-American singer and US civil rights activist Marian Anderson "A Voice of Authenticity and Justice" (Anthony Tommasini: New York Times, November 5, 2021). The edition, "impressively transferred and mastered" (Barbara Jepson: The Wall Street Journal, August 14, 2021), was nominated for a Grammy in November 2021.

His edition Arthur Rubinstein—The Complete Album Collection with 142 CDs was awarded the World Record for the "Largest CD box set for a classical instrumentalist" in 2011.

Awards 
Awarded to Russ or to releases produced by him:

 2022 Grammy Award Nomination – Best Historical Album: Glenn Gould—The Goldberg Variations—The Complete Unreleased 1981 Studio Sessions

 2022 Recording Academy Award (Japan) – 歴史的録音 (Historical Recording): Dimitri Mitropoulos—The Complete RCA and Columbia Album Collection

 2022 Diapason d'or de l'année – Rééditions (Reissues): Dimitri Mitropoulos—The Complete RCA and Columbia Album Collection

 2021 Grammy Award Nomination – Best Historical Album: Marian Anderson—Beyond the Music—Her Complete RCA Victor Recordings

 2020 Edison Award – The Document: Bruno Walter—The Complete Columbia Album Collection

 2020 Diapason d'or de l'année – Rééditions (Reissues): Bruno Walter—The Complete Columbia Album Collection

 2019 Grammy Award Nomination – Best Historical Album: The Great Comeback—Horowitz at Carnegie Hall

 2019 Diapason d’or de l’année – Archives: George Szell—The Complete Columbia Album Collection

 2019 Grammy Award Nomination – Best Historical Album: A Rhapsody in Blue—The Extraordinary Life of Oscar Levant

 2019 ICMA Award – Historical Recordings: Birgit Nilsson—The Great Live Recordings

 2018 Opus Klassik Award – Editorische Leistung des Jahres (Editorial Achievement of the Year): Leonard Bernstein—The Composer

 2018 Grammy Award – Best Historical Album: Leonard Bernstein—The Composer

 2018 Grammy Award Nomination – Best Historical Album: Glenn Gould—The Goldberg Variations—The Complete Unreleased Recording Sessions June 1955

 2017 Diapason d’or de l’année – Rééditions (Reissues): Rudolf Serkin—The Complete Columbia Album Collection

 2017 Grammy Award Nomination – Best Historical Album: Vladimir Horowitz—The Unreleased Live Recordings 1966–1983

 2015 CHOC de l’année: Glenn Gould Remastered—The Complete Columbia Album Collection

 2015 Diapason d’or de l’année – Rééditions (Reissues): Pierre Monteux—The Complete RCA Album Collection

 2013 CHOC de l’année – Rééditions (Reissues): Vladimir Horowitz–Live at Carnegie Hall

 2012 Echo Klassik – Musik-DVD Produktion des Jahres (Music DVD of the Year): Glenn Gould on Television—The Complete CBC Broadcasts

 2012 Edison Award – Best Documentation: Arthur Rubinstein—The Complete Album Collection

 2011 Guinness World Record – Largest CD box set for a classical instrumentalist: Arthur Rubinstein—The Complete Album Collection

 2010 Guinness World Record – Largest CD box set for a classical instrumentalist: Jascha Heifetz—The Complete Album Collection

References

External links 
 
 
 Robert Russ at Grammy.com

Living people
1971 births
Grammy Award winners
Musicians from Berlin
People from Reinickendorf